Geoscelionidae is a family of wasps in the superfamily Platygastroidea. It contains three extant species in two genera, native to South America and Africa, and several other genera known from fossils. It was originally erected as the tribe Geoscelionini within Scelionidae. It was raised to a full family in 2021.

Taxonomy 

 †Geoscelio  (1 species) Engel and Huang, 2016 Burmese amber, Myanmar, Late Cretaceous (Cenomanian)
 †Archaeoscelio  (2 species) Brues, 1940 Baltic amber, Eocene
 †Cobaloscelio  (2 species) Johnson and Masner 2007 Baltic amber, Eocene
 Plaumannion (2 species) Masner & Johnson Southeastern Brazil and Venezuela
 Huddlestonium  (1 species) Polaszek & Johnson, Sub-Saharan Africa

References 

Platygastroidea
Hymenoptera families